Five male athletes from Jordan competed at the 1996 Summer Paralympics in Atlanta, United States. Imad Gharbawi won the nation's only medal in athletics.

Medallists

See also
Jordan at the Paralympics
Jordan at the 1996 Summer Olympics

References 

Nations at the 1996 Summer Paralympics
1996
Summer Paralympics